John Henry Hayes may refer to:
 John Hayes (British politician), British Conservative Party politician
 Jack Hayes (politician), British Labour Party politician

See also
 John H. Hays, American Civil War Medal of Honor recipient